Alanesian (1954–1977) was an American Thoroughbred racing filly and successful broodmare. She was bred in Kentucky by E. Barry Ryan, a society trainer and owner of Normandy Farm in Lexington, Kentucky. She was purchased privately by  William Haggin Perry whose great-grandfather, James Ben Ali Haggin, owned Elmendorf Farm from which Normandy Farm had been formed in 1959.

For William Perry, Alanesian was not only his first highly successful runner whose wins included the now Grade 1 Spinaway Stakes, but who became a foundation mare for his breeding operation that was centered on a foal sharing partnership with Claiborne Farm in Lexington. As a result of this partnership, Alanesian produced Princessnesian, sired by Claiborne's highly influential stallion, Princequillo, and Boldnesian who was sired by Claiborne's preeminent stallion, Bold Ruler. Boldnesian's son, Bold Reasoning, sired 1977 U.S. Triple Crown champion, Seattle Slew. As well, Alanesian's daughter Quillesian was the dam of Revidere, William Perry's 1976 American Champion Three-Year-Old Filly.

Pedigree

References

 Alanesian's pedigree and partial racing stats

1954 racehorse births
1977 racehorse deaths
Racehorses bred in Kentucky
Racehorses trained in the United States
Thoroughbred family 4-m